James Roosevelt II (1907–1991) was an American congressman and son of 32nd US president Franklin D. Roosevelt.

James Roosevelt may also refer to:
 James Roosevelt I (1828–1900), American businessman and father of Franklin D. Roosevelt
 James Roosevelt Roosevelt (1854–1927), American diplomat and the older half-brother of Franklin D. Roosevelt
 James Roosevelt III (born 1945), attorney, Democratic Party official, son of James Roosevelt and grandson of Franklin D. Roosevelt
 James A. Roosevelt (1825–1898), American philanthropist and uncle of 26th US president Theodore Roosevelt
 James H. Roosevelt (1800–1863), American philanthropist
 James I. Roosevelt (1795–1875), United States Representative from New York
 James Roosevelt (1760–1847), American businessman and politician from New York City 
 James Jacobus Roosevelt (1759–1840), American businessman from New York City
 Jacobus James Roosevelt (1724–1777), father of James Jacobus Roosevelt
 Tadd Roosevelt (James Roosevelt Roosevelt Jr., 1879–1958), American heir and automobile worker, nephew of Franklin D. Roosevelt.